Dodonaea viscosa subsp. angustifolia, synonym Dodonaea angustifolia, (sand olive) is a slender shrub or small tree that occurs naturally from southern Africa to Arabia, as well as in Australia and New Zealand. The seed capsules are three-winged and are dispersed by wind. Although occurring in rocky areas, it is also cultivated to stabilise moving sand and to prevent erosion.

References

 A species account

Flora of South Africa
Trees of Africa
viscosa angustifolia